Jody Rae Thompson is a Canadian actress, screenwriter and filmmaker working in film and television.

Personal life
Thompson was born in Vancouver, British Columbia, to mother Grace Diane, and father, Ray Thompson, the lead singer of Canadian garage rock band The Wiggy Symphony. Her ancestry is Inuit, Irish and Danish. Thompson is married to Canadian filmmaker Bruce Marchfelder, who was also the Creative Director of UBC Studios at the University of British Columbia. The couple regularly work as a Producing/Directing team with several projects having aired on CBC and Telus Optik.

Acting career

Television
She is widely known for her regularly recurring character Devon Moore on the USA network's television series The 4400, but is also recognized as the warrior queen Azura in the television series Flash Gordon and in other recurring television roles including Blade: The Series, Terminal City, and Cold Squad and television appearances, including roles on Freedom, Fringe, Andromeda, Stargate, Smallville and Supernatural.

Film
She has acted in leading and starring roles in feature films and MOW's like Perfect Little Angels, Fear of Flying, also Mission to Mars, Shanghai Noon, 2012 among others. She has co-starred with Eric McCormack in X-Files producer Bob Goodwin's independent film Alien Trespass and played David Arquette's wife in the made-for-television movie, Happy Face Killer.

Writing career 
Thompson is currently developing a feature comedy with Obsidian Media.

Also in development is a children's half-hour television series and the miniseries, The Untitled Aklavik Project. Research and development phase for Aklavik, was provided by The Canada Council for the Arts. It is an hour-long drama with supernatural elements, based on true events and inspired by experiences related to aspects of Thompson's indigenous heritage.

Thompson also works consistently as a writer/director.

Her recent short My Dear Children, about a dying woman's final letter to her children, was a Platinum Winner at the AVA International Digital Communication Awards.

Her semi-autobiographical experimental film, Will of the Wisp, underscoring a young woman's struggle with her history of sexual abuse in a society that places high value on sexual attractiveness, received a special screening at the US Women in Psychology Conference, a Leo Award, Special Jury Prize at the Portland International Short-Short Film Festival and the Legacy Award, Women in Film Festival Vancouver. The film was funded by The Canada Council for the Arts. Thompson describes it as, "a silent film that speaks through a series of post-structuralist and surrealist signifiers in conversation."

The triptych of shorts Ms. Thompson wrote and directed titled, Alyssa, about a young woman coming to terms with her diagnosis and undergoing chemo, thereby forfeiting her ability to have children, was acknowledged as an outstanding initiative by the Canadian Association of Psychosocial Oncology. It stars Rhonda Dent and Gabrielle Rose of The Sweet Hereafter.

Producing career
She is the President of Little Wolf Productions – a production company dedicated to the creation of film and video artworks that endeavor to relieve social injustice and advance a message of hope, mercy and reconciliation. Some projects include:

Montaña de Luz, (doc 45 min), Noonday Films. It is an uplifting story about a Honduran orphanage that cares for children living with HIV. The film premiered at the Rhode Island International Film Festival and was Winner of the Heartland Film Festival's Crystal Heart Award (an award which "honors filmmakers whose work explores the human journey by artistically expressing hope and respect for the positive values of life").

Filmography

Film

Television

References

External links

 Official site
 

1976 births
Actresses from Vancouver
Canadian documentary film directors
Canadian film actresses
Canadian film editors
Film producers from British Columbia
Canadian people of English descent
Canadian people of German descent
Canadian women screenwriters
Canadian television actresses
Canadian women film directors
Canadian women film producers
Film directors from Vancouver
Living people
Writers from Vancouver
Canadian women film editors
Canadian women documentary filmmakers